Paper money of the Austro-Hungarian krone appeared in the beginning of the 20th century - almost ten years after the coins were introduced. All banknotes were bilingual (German and Hungarian), and the value was indicated in eight other languages (Czech, Polish, Croatian, Slovene, Serbian, Italian, Ruthenen (Ukrainian) and Romanian). After the dissolution of the empire banknotes were overstamped to limit their circulation according to the new borders.

References

Notes

See also

Austro-Hungarian krone
Currencies of Austria-Hungary